Biliaivka Raion was a raion (district) in Odesa Oblast of Ukraine. Its administrative center was the city of Biliaivka, which had a status of the city of oblast significance and did not belong to the raion. The raion was abolished and its territory was merged into Odesa Raion on 18 July 2020 as part of the administrative reform of Ukraine, which reduced the number of raions of Odesa Oblast to seven.  The last estimate of the raion population was 

Until 2016, the city of Biliaivka was part of Biliaivka Raion. On 28 January 2016, Biliaivka was designated the city of oblast significance, though it remained the center of the raion.

References

Former raions of Odesa Oblast
1923 establishments in the Soviet Union
Ukrainian raions abolished during the 2020 administrative reform